The Zangmar River (also known as the Ṭłmut River) is a river in Maku County, West Azarbaijan Province, Iran. It originates in the Zagros Mountains above Maku, Iran along the Iran–Turkey border, not far from Mount Ararat and flows south and east into the Araxes at the town of Pol Dasht.

After leaving Maku, the river flows past Tappeh Bashi-ye Namaz, and Moradluy-e Olya before entering the Araxes.

References

Rivers of Iran
Landforms of West Azerbaijan Province
Mount Ararat